Sonic Firestorm is the second studio album by British power metal band DragonForce, released through Noise Records on 11 May 2004. It is the first album to feature bassist Adrian Lambert and drummer Dave Mackintosh. The reissue of this album was released on 22 February 2010, along with a remixed and remastered version of the band's first album, Valley of the Damned. The re-release also came with the bonus track "Cry of the Brave", which was a Japanese bonus track on the original release.

Production
The recording and mixing for the band's second album took place at Surrey's Thin Ice Studios, from 6 October to 10 December 2003. All the guitars were recorded at Herman Li's LamerLuser Studios in London.

Track listing
Along with the bonus track "Cry of the Brave", which was initially only included as a Japanese bonus track on the original release, the 2010 re-release includes a bonus DVD with an interview from Dave Mackintosh and a commentary from Herman Li and Sam Totman, as well as live "Fury of the Storm" and "Fields of Despair" performances in Japan from 2005.

Personnel
DragonForce
ZP Theart – vocals
Herman Li – guitars, acoustic guitar
Sam Totman – guitars, acoustic guitar
Vadim Pruzhanov - keyboards, piano, additional acoustic guitar
Adrian Lambert – bass
Dave Mackintosh – drums

Additional personnel
Clive Nolan – backing vocals

Production
Produced by Karl Groom and DragonForce
Recorded and mixed at Thin Ice Studios by Karl Groom
All guitars recorded at Herman Li's LamerLuser Studios, London, United Kingdom
Engineered by Karl Groom
All vocals recorded by Richard West
Mastered by Eberhard Kohler at Powerplay Mastering

In other media
The song "Fury of the Storm" is featured as a playable track in Guitar Hero: Warriors of Rock.

Charts

Footnotes

External links
Sonic Firestorm on the official website

2004 albums
DragonForce albums
Noise Records albums
Sanctuary Records albums
Albums produced by Karl Groom